The Canton of Jonzac is a canton of the Charente-Maritime département, in France. At the French canton reorganisation which came into effect in March 2015, the canton was expanded from 20 to 46 communes (3 of which merged into the new commune Réaux-sur-Trèfle):
 
Agudelle
Allas-Bocage
Allas-Champagne
Archiac
Arthenac
Brie-sous-Archiac
Celles
Champagnac
Chaunac
Cierzac
Clam
Clion
Consac
Fontaines-d'Ozillac
Germignac
Guitinières
Jarnac-Champagne
Jonzac
Léoville
Lonzac
Lussac
Meux
Mortiers
Neuillac
Neulles
Nieul-le-Virouil
Ozillac
Réaux-sur-Trèfle
Saint-Ciers-Champagne
Saint-Dizant-du-Bois
Sainte-Lheurine
Saint-Eugène
Saint-Georges-Antignac
Saint-Germain-de-Lusignan
Saint-Germain-de-Vibrac
Saint-Hilaire-du-Bois
Saint-Maigrin
Saint-Martial-de-Vitaterne
Saint-Martial-sur-Né
Saint-Médard
Saint-Sigismond-de-Clermont
Saint-Simon-de-Bordes
Vibrac
Villexavier

Population history

See also 
 Charente-Maritime
 Arrondissements of the Charente-Maritime department
 Cantons of the Charente-Maritime department
 Communes of the Charente-Maritime department

References

Jonzac